is a 1988 Japanese erotic drama film directed by Shusuke Kaneko. It was released on 23 April 1988. The film was the second-to-last entry in Nikkatsu's series of Roman Porno films, a higher budget version of the pink film.

Plot
When a greedy land developer forces a popular cabaret to shut down, the owner's daughter goes on a trek to visit her father's old girlfriends to reminisce about the past. The story has been taken by critics as a metaphor for the demise of the Nikkatsu studio itself which would soon halt film production.

Cast
Miyuki Katō
Yasuo Daichi
Yōko Takagi
Kyōko Hashimoto
Kō Watanabe

Reception

Accolades
It was chosen as the 9th best film at the 10th Yokohama Film Festival.

References

External links

1980s erotic drama films
Films directed by Shusuke Kaneko
Pink films
Nikkatsu Roman Porno
1988 drama films
1988 films
1980s Japanese-language films
1980s Japanese films